The 12339 / 12340 Coalfield Express is a Superfast class Indian Railways day train connecting Kolkata with industrial towns and coal belts of Durgapur, Raniganj, Asansol, Dhanbad as well as between Dhanbad and Howrah railway station.

Schedule
12339 Coalfield Express leaves  terminal at 5:20 p.m. from Platform No. 12 every day and reaches  at 9:40 p.m. the same day.
12340 Coalfield Express departs Dhanbad Junction at 5:50 a.m. every day and arrives at Howrah at 10:30 a.m. the same day.

Rake sharing
It shares its route with the Agniveena Express and the Shantiniketan Express.

It is the twin train of the Black Diamond Express, which runs from Dhanbad to Howrah as well. It differs in that it runs through the Howrah–Barddhaman chord line while the Black Diamond Express goes through the Howrah–Barddhaman main line.

The train does not stop at Barddhaman and runs non-stop for 132 km from Howrah to Mankar in around 1 hr 39 min, at a top speed of 130 km/hr.

Route & halts

Traction
Both trains are hauled by a WAP-7 of Howrah Electric Loco Shed on its entire journey.

Trivia

In 2011, the train travelled several kilometres on the wrong track during a journey. The train took the wrong track at Khana Junction and travelled towards Bolpur instead of Dhanbad. It was sent back on the right track after the staff at the Talit railway station spotted the error.

In 1982 the train had a scheduled stop at Barddhaman junction. However, due to overbearing notoriety of the daily commuters in the Barddhaman-Howrah section, which often culminated in serious altercations with other passengers, the stoppage had been revoked. An EMU (electric multiple unit) local train was put into the service to cater to the daily passengers travelling from Barddhaman to Howrah at that particular hour of the day. The train had few stops in between the two stations.

Since the introduction of the new LHB racks the instances of daily commuters disturbing other commuters have lessened as the sitting space has been increased and standing space decreased.

References

Express trains in India
Rail transport in West Bengal
Rail transport in Jharkhand
Mining in West Bengal
Rail transport in Howrah
Transport in Dhanbad
Named passenger trains of India